Drop, DROP, drops or DROPS may refer to:

 Drop (liquid) or droplet, a small volume of liquid
 Eye drops, saline (sometimes mydriatic) drops used as medication for the eyes
 Drop (unit), a unit of measure of volume
 Falling (physics), allowing an object to fall or drop
Free fall
 Drop, or topographic prominence, the height of a hill above its surroundings

Computers and technology 
 Drop (SQL), a command in SQL queries to remove an existing database, table, index, or view
 Drop (telecommunication), the portion of a device directly connected to the internal station facilities
 Don't Route Or Peer (DROP) list, a list of spam sources

Confectionery 
 Drops (confectionery), a general term for small, round sweets
 Lemon drop (candy), a hard-sugar, lemon-flavored sweet
 Hershey's Drops, chocolate sweets based on the Hershey bar
 London drops, a Swedish/Finnish sugar-coated liquorice sweet
 Drop (Eng. Salty liquorice), a common Dutch sweet
 Cough drop, or throat lozenge, a medicated confectionery

Sports 
 Drops Cycling Team, a British women's professional cycling team
 Drop (boxing), a type of punch used in boxing
 Drop kick, a type of kick in various forms of football and rugby
 Drop goal, a way of scoring points in rugby
 Bat drop, a calculation used to regulate baseball bats
 Drop ball (disambiguation)
 Drop shot (disambiguation)

Music 
 Drop (music), a section in music where the music will crescendo to a climax, pause briefly, then resume
 Needle drop (DJing), a technique used by DJs to cue music quickly
 Drops, a J-Pop voice acting group under the label Starchild
 Drop, a term, used as a verb or noun, to refer to a piece of music’s, video game’s, copypasta's etc. release

Albums
 Drop (The Shamen album), 1987
 Drop (Bride album), 1995
 Drop (Gavin Harrison & 05Ric album), 2007
 Drop (Thee Oh Sees album), 2014
 D.R.O.P., a 1989 album by ZELDA

Songs
 "Drop" (The Pharcyde song), 1995
 "Drop" (Timbaland & Magoo song), 2001
 "Drop" (Rich Boy song), 2009
 "Drop" (Dallas Smith song), 2019

 "Drop", a song by Blue October from the album Consent to Treatment, 2000
 "Drop", a song by Chloe x Halle from the EP Sugar Symphony, 2016
 "Drop", a song by Robert Forster from the album Calling from a Country Phone, 1993
 "Drop", a 1998 song by Kenji and Artofficial, early aliases for Mike Shinoda and Joe Hahn respectively
 "Drop", a 2006 song by American jazz artist, Plunky
 "Drop", a 2008 song by Ying Yang Twins
 "Drop", a 2022 song by Khalisol which represented New Mexico in the American Song Contest

Other uses 
 Drop (b-boy move), a breakdancing technique
 Drop (company), an American e-commerce company
 Drop (loyalty program), a Canadian coalition customer loyalty program
 Drop (policy debate), an argument that goes unanswered
 Drop, Masovian Voivodeship, a village in east-central Poland
 Ball drop, an annual event held every New Year's Eve in New York City's Times Square
 Dead drop, a method of passing items or information within espionage tradecraft
 Voltage drop, a decrease in voltage across electrical devices in a circuit
 Deferred Retirement Option Plan, or Deferred Retirement Option Program
 Demountable Rack Offload and Pickup System (DROPS), a family of logistics vehicles operated by the British Army

See also 
 
 
 The Drop (disambiguation)
 Dewdrop (disambiguation)
 Droplets (disambiguation)
 Dropout (disambiguation)
 Dropped (disambiguation)
 Dropper
 Drip (disambiguation)